This is a list of notable actresses in Kannada cinema.

A 

 Aamani
 Abhirami
 Aarathi
 Anu Mehta
 Aindrita Ray
 Amulya
 Asha Bhat
 Amy Jackson
 Ambika
 Archana Jois
 Amrutha Iyengar
 Anu Prabhakar
 Anushree
 Archana
 Archana
 Aruna Irani
 Arundhati Nag
 Anupama Gowda
 Asha Sharath
 Asha Parekh
 Amritha Aiyer
 Asmita Sood
 Aishani Shetty
 Akshara Gowda
 Aruna Balraj
 Aishwarya Arjun
 Avantika Shetty
 Aditi Prabhudeva
 Ashika Ranganath
 Anita Hassanandani
 Advani Lakshmi Devi

B 

 Bhama
 Bhanupriya
 Bhavya
 Bhagyashree
 Bhavana
 Bhavana
 Bhavana Rao
 Bhoomi Shetty
 Bharathi Vishnuvardhan
 Bhargavi Narayan
 Bhumika Chawla
 B. Jayashree

C 

 Chandrakala
 Chandrika
 Chaya Singh
 Catherine Tresa
 Chitkala Biradar

D 

 Deepa
 Deepti Sati
 Disha Madan
 Deepa Sannidhi
 Divya Spandana
 Disha Poovaiah
 Dubbing Janaki
 Deepika Padukone

E 

 Erica Fernandes
 Ester Noronha

G 

 Gautami
 Gayatri
 Geetha
 Gayathiri Iyer
 Genelia D'Souza
 Gayatri Jayaraman

H 

 Harini
 Hariprriya
 Hema Choudhary
 Hebah Patel
 Harshika Poonacha

I 

 Indira Devi
 Isha Koppikar

J 

 Jayalalithaa
 Jayamala
 Jayamalini
 Jaya Pradha
 Jayanthi
 Jyotika
 Jennifer Kotwal

K 

 Kalpana
 Kanchana
 Karthika Nair
 Kaveri
 Kausalya
 Kriti Kharbanda
 Krishna Kumari
 Kumari Padmini
 Kusalakumari
 Kavitha Gowda
 Kutty Padmini
 Kavya Shetty
 Karunya Ram
 Kruttika Ravindra
 Kristina Akheeva

L 

 Laila
 Lakshmi
 Lakshmidevi
 Leelavathi
 Lakshmi Gopalaswamy

M 

 Meena
 Madhoo
 Madhavi
 Manjula
 Meghasri
 Malashri
 Mayuri Kyatari
 Manorama 
 Manvitha Kamath
 Mahalakshmi
 Madhuri Itagi
 Meera Jasmine
 Milana Nagaraj
 Meghana Raj
 Moon Moon Sen
 Meenakshi Dixit
 Meghana Gaonkar

N 

 Nalini
 Nagma
 Namitha
 Nayanthara
 Neethu
 Navya Nair
 Nivedhitha
 Nabha Natesh
 Nithya Menon
 Nikki Galrani
 Nithya Ram
 Neha Shetty
 Nikesha Patel
 Nishvika Naidu
 Nikita Thukral
 Nidhi Subbaiah
 Nisha Ravikrishnan

O 

 
 Oviya Helen

P 

 Poorna
 Padmavati Rao
 Pandari Bai
 Parvathy
 Pooja Gandhi
 Pramila Joshai
 Prema
 Prathima Devi
 Pranitha Subhash
 Priyanka Thimmesh
 Priya Anand
 Priyamani
 Parul Yadav
 Priya Tendulkar
 Pavitra Lokesh
 Priyanka Upendra
 Priyanka Kothari

R 

 Radha
 Rekha
 Rashmi
 Radhika Chetan
 Rachita Ram
 Ranya Rao
 Radhika
 Rachel David
 Roopadevi
 Raai Laxmi
 Radhika Pandit
 Ragini Dwivedi
 Rashmi Prabhakar
 Rajani
 Ramya Krishna
 Ranjani Raghavan
 Rashmika Mandanna
 Rajasulochana
 Rekha
 Rachana Inder
 Roshni Prakash
 Rekha Vedavyas
 Raveena Tandon
 Rishika Singh
 Roja Ramani
 Ramya Barna
 Radhika Narayan
 Rajshri Ponnappa
 Renukamma Murugodu
 Rakul Preet Singh
 Reba Monica John

S 

 Sanghavi
 Saroja Devi
 Satyabhama
 Savitri
 Sithara
 Shilpa
 Sadha
 Shilpa Shetty
 Shobha
 Sayyeshaa
 Shobhana
 Shwetha
 Sherin
 Sanjana Anand
 Sushma Raj
 Samyuktha Hegde
 Shubha
 Sharmiela Mandre
 Suhasini Maniratnam
 Sudha Chandran
 Sukanya
 Shruti
 Suman Ranganathan
 Sonu Gowda
 Sridevi
 Soundarya
 Sripriya
 Sanjjanaa
 Sudharani
 Sree Leela
 Sowcar Janaki
 Shraddha Das
 Shriya Saran
 Sindhu Tolani
 Shubha Poonja
 Sai Dhanshika
 Sonal Monteiro
 Sangeetha Bhat
 Sudha Belawadi
 Sindhu Lokanath
 Samyukta Hornad
 Srinidhi Shetty
 Shraddha Srinath
 Shruti Hariharan
 Sangeita Chauhan
 Shanvi Srivastava
 Sanchita Padukone
 Shwetha Srivatsav
 Sangeetha Sringeri

T 

 Tara
 Tulasi
 Tripuramba
 Tanya Hope
 Tulip Joshi

U 

 Umashree
 Urvashi
 Urvashi Rautela

V 

 Vedhika
 Vijayalakshmi
 Vanitha Vasu
 Veena Sundar
 Vijayalalitha
 Vijayashanti
 Vinaya Prasad
 Varsha Bollamma
 Vaishnavi Gowda
 Vaibhavi Shandilya
 Vijayalakshmi Singh
 Vaishali Kasaravalli
 Varalaxmi Sarathkumar

Y 

 Yamuna
 Yagna Shetty

 
Lists of Indian actresses